Grapholita delineana, known generally as Eurasian hemp moth, is a species of tortricid moth in the family Tortricidae. Other common names include the hemp moth and hemp borer.

The MONA or Hodges number for Grapholita delineana is 3443.1.

References

 Brown J (2009). "A new genus and species of Grapholitini (Lepidoptera, Tortricidae) from Florida, U.S.A". ZooKeys 23: 39-46.

Further reading

 

Grapholitini